Enrique Wild (born 27 September 1999) is a Swiss footballer who plays as a defender for Austrian club Juniors OÖ on loan from LASK.

Club career
On 1 September 2020, Wild signed a two-year contract with Juniors OÖ in Austria.

On 1 July 2021, Wild moved to LASK in the top-tier Austrian Football Bundesliga. On 7 February 2022, he returned to Juniors OÖ on loan.

Career statistics

Club

Notes

References

1999 births
People from Frauenfeld
Living people
Swiss men's footballers
Switzerland youth international footballers
Association football defenders
FC Wil players
FC Zürich players
FC Juniors OÖ players
LASK players
Swiss Challenge League players
2. Liga (Austria) players
Austrian Football Bundesliga players
Swiss expatriate footballers
Swiss expatriate sportspeople in Austria
Expatriate footballers in Austria
Sportspeople from Thurgau